Blizzard Pass was the first solo adventure module for the Dungeons & Dragons fantasy role-playing game. It was published  by TSR in 1983 and used the Basic Rules.

Plot summary
Blizzard Pass is a solo adventure for a thief level 1–3. The thief must cross Blizzard Pass, and then penetrate a cavern system within Blizzard Pass to free the other adventurers from a prison. The module also contains a short adventure for a party of characters level 2–3, dealing with the exploration of the Pass.

Publication history
Blizzard Pass was written by David Cook and published in 1983. Module M1 consisted of a 32-page booklet with an "invisible ink" pen attached to its outer folder and featured a cover by Tim Truman.

Blizzard Pass is designed for use with the Basic Rules. Hidden messages written in invisible ink are placed throughout the module in blank boxes. The module comes with a special pen which, when rubbed over a box, reveals the hidden message. The module has a total of 309 entries, nearly half of which are blank and need to be made visible.

The 10th Anniversary Dungeons & Dragons Collector's Set boxed set, published by TSR in 1984, included the rulebooks from the Basic, Expert, and Companion sets; modules AC2, AC3, B1, B2, and M1, Blizzard Pass; Player Character Record Sheets; and dice; this set was limited to 1,000 copies, and was sold by mail and at GenCon 17.

In 1985, TSR published Into the Maelstrom and assigned it the module code M1. To avoid confusion, Blizzard Pass was retroactively assigned the code MSOLO1.

Reception
Doug Cowie reviewed Blizzard Pass for Imagine magazine. He found it very entertaining. Cowie's main criticism was that at the beginning there is a choice between two options "either of which could equally be sound or foolhardy". Picking the wrong one results in the character's death with no chance of escape. After that, though, Cowie felt that the play becomes "more varied and subtle". He thought the invisible ink "a gimmick", but a "hugely entertaining one". In conclusion, Cowie found this a "well thought out an enjoyable solo adventure".

Jim Bambra reviewed Blizzard Pass for White Dwarf, and gave it 6/10 overall, calling it "a new departure in module design", noting that "Instead of simply printing all the entries clearly TSR have opted for an invisible ink format." Bambra felt that this short adventure was easy enough to complete with a reasonable amount of luck, but noted that "The invisible ink novelty soon grows a bit thin after you've tediously filled in your 4th and 5th box." Bambra felt that the module was "horrendously overpriced and not worth considering", concluding by saying "M1 is simply not as good as the Fighting Fantasy Gamebooks, which have the advantages of being considerably cheaper and longer. M1's main appeal will lie with children; any just getting into D&D will no doubt greatly enjoy it."

Further reading
Review: Different Worlds #37 and Fantasy Gamer #1 (1983)

References

Dungeons & Dragons modules
Mystara
Role-playing game supplements introduced in 1983